The Woman and the Stranger is a 1985 East German film directed by Rainer Simon. It is based on Leonhard Frank's novella "Karl und Anna" and tells the story of two friends in a POW camp during  World War I. One of them escapes and forms a relationship with the other man's wife. After the war her husband returns. The film was entered into the 35th Berlin International Film Festival, where it won the Golden Bear.

It is a remake of Homecoming (1928).

Cast
 Joachim Lätsch as Karl
 Peter Zimmermann as Richard
 Kathrin Waligura as Anna
 Christine Schorn as Trude
 Siegfried Höchst as Horst
 Hans-Uwe Bauer as Verwirrter Soldat
 Katrin Knappe as Marie
 Ulrich Mühe as Revolutionär
 Herbert Sand as Kriegsinvalide
 Daniel Fries as Trudes kleiner Sohn
 Roman-Eckhard Galonska as Nachbar
 Mirko Haninger as Soldat am Fenster
 Reiner Heise as Deutscher Gefangener
 Rita Hirschberger as Elfie

References

External links 

1985 films
East German films
1980s German-language films
World War I prisoner of war films
Golden Bear winners
Films directed by Rainer Simon
Remakes of German films
Sound film remakes of silent films
1980s German films